This article is about the American Billboard Hot 100 chart held during the 2010s.

The Billboard Hot 100 is a chart that ranks the best-performing songs of the United States. Published by Billboard magazine, the data are compiled by Nielsen SoundScan based collectively on each single's weekly physical and digital sales, airplay, and, since 2012, streaming. Streaming became the dominant metric of the Hot 100 beginning in 2015, propelled by technology changes.

A new chart is compiled and officially released to the public every Tuesday in Billboard magazine and on its website. Each chart is dated with the "week-ending" date of the Saturday four days later. (Before 2018, the gap between the chart date and the date of its release was one week longer, and prior to the July 25, 2015 issue, the chart was released every Thursday.)

Number-one singles

Key
 – Number-one single of the year

Notes
For the first five weeks that "Perfect" by Ed Sheeran was at number one, the duet version between Sheeran and Beyoncé was the song's billing on the Hot 100.
For the first week that "Old Town Road" by Lil Nas X was at number one, the solo version was the song's billing on the Hot 100. The remix with Billy Ray Cyrus hit number one the following week.
 Across four separate holiday season runs (2019–2022), "All I Want for Christmas Is You" has accumulated 12 total weeks at number one. It is also the first song in the history of the Hot 100 to reach number one in at least three separate chart runs.

Statistics

Artists by total number-one singles

The following artists achieved three or more number-one singles during the 2010s. A number of artists had number-one singles on their own as well as part of a collaboration.

Artists by total cumulative weeks at number-one

The following artists were featured at the top of the Hot 100 for the highest cumulative number of weeks during the 2010s. Some totals include in part or in whole weeks spent at number one as part of a collaboration.

Songs by total number of weeks at number one

The following songs were featured at the top of the Hot 100 for the highest number of weeks during the 2010s.

See also
 List of Billboard number-one singles
 2010s in music
 List of UK Singles Chart number ones of the 2010s
 List of Billboard Hot 100 number-one singles of the 2020s

References 

 2010s
United States Hot 100